Sacred lotus may refer to:
Nelumbo nucifera, also known as "Indian lotus" 
Padma (attribute), Nelumbo nucifera in Indian religions
Lotus throne in Buddhist and Hindu art
Nymphaea caerulea, the "blue lotus" in Ancient Egyptian religion
Utpala in Buddhist art
Nymphaea lotus, the "white lotus" in Ancient Egyptian religion

See also 
Lotus (disambiguation)